The Journal of Pediatric Nursing (also known as JPN) is a peer-reviewed nursing journal publishing evidence-based practice, quality improvement, theory, and research papers on a variety of pediatric nursing topics, covering the life span from birth to adolescence. It is published by Elsevier.

History 
The journal was established in 1986, with Dr Cecily L. Betz as its founding editor-in-chief. It is the official journal of the Society of Pediatric Nurses and the Pediatric Endocrinology Nursing Society and its current editor-in-chief is Dr Cecily L. Betz (University of Southern California).

Abstracting and indexing 
The journal is abstracted and indexed in:

 CINAHL
 MEDLINE
 PubMed

According to the Journal Citation Reports, the journal has a 2017 impact factor of 1.800.

References 

Pediatric nursing journals
Publications established in 1986
Elsevier academic journals